The Halle Tony Garnier is an arena and concert hall in Lyon, France. It was designed by Tony Garnier in 1905. Originally a slaughterhouse, the building was renovated in 1987 and opened as a concert hall in 1988. With a capacity of nearly 17,000, it is the third biggest venue in France after the Accor Arena and Paris La Défense Arena.

History
The original building opened in 1908 as a cattle market and slaughterhouse, known as "La Mouche". During World War I, the building was used as an armory until 1928, when it returned to a cattle market and slaughterhouse. The market and slaughterhouse closed in 1967. On 16 May 1975, the building was recognized as a Monument historique. In 1987, the City of Lyon hired Reichen & Robert and HTVS to renovate the slaughterhouse into a modern concert hall. The Hall opened in late January 1988.

Shows

Events: Mahana (tourism), the Student

Concerts: a-ha, Arcade Fire, AC/DC, Aerosmith, Another Level, Ariana Grande, Alizée, Charles Aznavour, Beyoncé, The Blackout, The Bravery, Biffy Clyro, Bon Jovi, Coldplay, Phil Collins, The Corrs, The Cranberries, Deep Purple, Depeche Mode, Celine Dion, Dire Straits, Bob Dylan, Fad Gadget, Mylène Farmer, The Fatima Mansions, Garbage, Genesis, The Gossip, Green Day, Guns N' Roses, Janet Jackson, Keane, Alicia Keys, Mark Knopfler, Lenny Kravitz, Lady Gaga, Avril Lavigne, Les Enfoirés, Limp Bizkit, Lorie, Marilyn Manson, Massive Attack, Brian May, Paul McCartney, Metallica, George Michael, Kylie Minogue, Motörhead, Muse, Nightwish, Noisettes, Oberkampf, The Offspring, Page & Plant, Sean Paul, Laura Pausini, Katy Perry, P!nk, Placebo, Red Hot Chili Peppers, Lionel Richie, Rihanna, Michel Sardou, Scorpions, Semi Precious Weapons, Soulsavers, Britney Spears, Spice Girls, Bruce Springsteen, Sting, Superbus, System of a Down, Justin Timberlake, Tokio Hotel, Tool, Tina Turner, U2, Usher, Vitaa, Robbie Williams, Violetta Live, James Blunt, Zazie, ZZ Top, Laura Pausini, Within Temptation Imagine Dragons, Ariana Grande, Chris Brown, Soy Luna Live, Dream Theater, and Dua Lipa.

Spectacles and Performances: Holiday on Ice, Riverdance, Le Roi Soleil, Les Restos du coeur (à plusieurs reprises), Johnny Haliday and The Sun King

Accessibility
This site is served by the subway station: Debourg.

Bus lines C7 - C22 - 60

Stations Vélo'v: 
Avenue Tony Garnier/Voie nouvelle (Halle Tony-Garnier) – Place de l'École/rue de St-Cloud.

See also
 List of theatres and entertainment venues in Lyon
 List of indoor arenas in France

References

External links

 

7th arrondissement of Lyon
Music venues in France
Entertainment venues in Lyon
1908 establishments in France
1988 establishments in France